Neighbours is an Australian television soap opera created by Reg Watson. It was first broadcast on 18 March 1985. The following is a list of characters that first appeared in the serial in 1997, by order of first appearance. All characters were introduced by the show's executive producer Stanley Walsh. The 13th season of Neighbours began airing from 20 January 1997. Lisa Elliot was introduced in the same month. February saw the arrival of student Tim Buckley. Ben Atkins debuted in April, while Amy Greenwood made her first appearance in July. Matt Compton and Ben's sister Caitlin Atkins were introduced in September. November saw the first appearance of Paul McClain.

Lisa Elliot

Lisa Elliot, played by Kate Straub, made her first screen appearance on 27 January 1997. Straub was cast after being spotted in the audience of variety television show Hey Hey It's Saturday. Straub told Amanda Ruben of TV Week that she felt embarrassed by what had happened, but considered it the break she needed. She added "I was an avid fan of Neighbours when Kylie and Jason were on, but I haven't watched much since. But my short time with the show has given me a huge appreciation of the television industry." Straub was initially contracted with the show until early 1997. Lisa is introduced as a new teacher at Erinsborough High. Straub said it was "a great part to have". Jason Herbison of Inside Soap noted that at 21, Straub was barely old enough to have achieved a teaching qualification in real life. Producers decided not to renew Straub's contract, and Herbison reported that her lack of training contributed to their decision.

Lisa moves to Erinsborough after she gets a job as a science teacher at the local high school. When Susan Kennedy (Jackie Woodburne) learns Lisa needs somewhere to stay, she tells her the residents of Number 30 Ramsay Street are looking for a new housemate and Lisa moves in. She gets on well with sisters Catherine O'Brien (Radha Mitchell) and Sarah Beaumont (Nicola Charles). Lisa is the target of several pranks by her students, including boot polish on her bike seat. Lisa and Sarah compete for the same man, and fall out when Lisa offers the spare room to Darren Stark (Todd MacDonald), who was involved in the breakdown of Catherine's relationship with Malcolm Kennedy (Benjamin McNair). They soon reconcile and invite Ben Atkins (Brett Cousins) to become their new housemate.

Lou Carpenter (Tom Oliver) persuades Lisa to coach the netball team. She becomes depressed when the team lose the final, but Sarah later diagnoses her with an over-active thyroid. Billy Kennedy (Jesse Spencer) becomes suspicious of Lisa's marking methods and writes an insulting sentence in his essay, which Lisa fails to notice. Billy proves that Lisa has not been reading the student's essays and Susan launches an investigation. Lisa quits her job, realising that she is not cut out for teaching. She later accepts a job in the research labs at a university in Tasmania. Before Lisa's leaving party, Ben overhears her talking about him on the phone and believes she has feelings for him. Ben kisses Lisa and she tells him that they might have had a chance of a relationship if she was not about to leave. After selling her belongings at a garage sale, Lisa says her goodbyes and leaves.

Tim Buckley

Tim Buckley, played by Dean Francis, made his first screen appearance on 27 February 1997. Tim was a high school student, who was a friend of Michael Martin (Troy Beckwith). He stayed with Michael's family on Ramsay Street. Tim was a shy boy, who was befriended by his school teacher Susan Kennedy (Jackie Woodburne). Tim developed a crush on Susan after she took him to the theatre. An Inside Soap reporter observed that it was clear Tim confused her friendly gestures for something more. They also noted that Tim became "a bit too dependent" on Susan's company. A few weeks later, Tim was unable to hold back his feelings for Susan and kissed her. Woodburne commented that to Tim it was not just a childish crush, saying "he truly think that he's in love with Susan. It's a very serious thing as far as he's concerned." Susan did not respond to the kiss, but Tim told her he was in love with her. Woodburne said Susan was not attracted to Tim, but felt an obligation to him, as it was affecting his studies. When Tim learned this, he became embarrassed and threatened to leave town.

Tim comes to stay with Michael Martin's family while he repeats Year 12. He tells Michael's sister, Hannah (Rebecca Ritters), that he had to drop out of school when his dad got sick. Tim is introduced to his teachers Susan Kennedy and Lisa Elliot (Kate Straub). He struggles to connect with anyone at school due to his age. Tim invites Susan to come to the theatre with him to see a play and she agrees. Tim later asks for her help with his history essay and she begins tutoring him. Toadfish Rebecchi (Ryan Moloney) takes Tim aside and tells him that he knows all about his crush on Susan and warns him to back off. Tim admits to Susan that he likes her, but wants to stop the rumours about him having a crush on her. When Susan searches out a book for Tim, she begins quoting from it and Tim kisses her. He later tells Susan that he loves her, but she lets him down gently. He sends her a love letter and Susan's husband, Karl (Alan Fletcher), confronts Tim. He leaves that same day, but Susan drives to his home and convinces him to return to Erinsborough for his schooling. However, Tim finds it hard being back and he returns home after saying goodbye to Susan.

Ben Atkins

Ben Atkins (previously Christopher Wilkinson), played by Brett Cousins, made his first screen appearance on 9 April 1997. Cousins previously appeared in the show in a small guest role. He was surprised when he learned that he had won the role of Ben, saying "I could hardly believe it when they rang and said I had the part." A Daily Record reporter commented on Ben's arrival, saying "the girls at number 30 are bowled over by their new flatmate, Ben Atkins ... but he is harbouring a secret which has something to do with Ruth." It later emerged that Ben was actually Ruth Wilkinson's (Ailsa Piper) son. She had given birth to him when she was just 16 and kept it to herself. Ben's arrival won an AFI Award and Piper said the episode was "beautifully written", allowing her and Cousins to feed the characters and not just the plot.

Amy Greenwood

Amy Greenwood, played by Jacinta Stapleton, made her first screen appearance on 10 July 1997. Stapleton had previously guested in a few television dramas, before being cast in the regular role of Amy. She called Neighbours "the best training ground" for herself. Amy was "fun-loving", "mischievous" and "sneaky". Stapleton said she shared some similarities to Amy, as they both liked to party and did not take things too seriously. Amy began a relationship with Lance Wilkinson (Andrew Bibby) shortly after meeting him. A reporter from The Age branded Amy "Ramsay Street's wild child turned party, fashion and gossip queen".

Matt Compton

Matt Compton, played by Jonathon Kovac, made his first screen appearance on 4 September 1997. Kovac was working at Melbourne's Crown Entertainment Complex when he saw and greeted the Neighbours casting agent. A couple of weeks later, his own agent informed him the casting agent wanted to see him. He was offered the role of Matt soon after and it marked his first acting role. Of his casting, Kovac commented "I was happy. Thrilled. It took a long time for it to sink in." Matt was introduced as a love interest for Sarah Beaumont, after actress Nicola Charles complained about a "lack of success" in her character's romantic life. Kovac found his first storyline "pretty nerve-racking", adding "It is hard enough just acting, let alone being thrown into a romance." Matt was also the first policeman to live on Ramsay Street. Jason Herbison of Inside Soap commented "Writers have always tried to avoid the long arm of the law, deeming it as a soap stereotype." Charles said there is an instant attraction between Sarah and Matt, and Sarah wants him to move into Number 30 as soon as she sees him. However, her housemate, Ben Atkins (Brett Cousins), is not so keen, as he does not want to live with a policeman. The pair had also agreed there would be no household relationships, so Matt and Sarah try to hide their attraction to one another, until it becomes too hard. Charles was pleased that her character had finally been given a love interest, but she did not want Sarah to settle into a long-term relationship. Sarah and Matt's romance marked Charles and Kovac's first on-screen love scenes. Kovac admitted that the kissing scenes were initially hard to do in front of the crew, but he praised Charles for helping him. An Inside Soap reporter branded the character "hunky".

Matt applies for the spare room at Number 30 Ramsay Street and is interviewed by Sarah Beaumont and Ben Atkins. When Ben learns Matt is a policeman, he worries about living with him, but Sarah informs Matt that he can move in. Matt pulls Ben over as his car is not registered and gives him a ticket. When he returns home, Matt apologises to Ben and invites him to the pub to play pool. While Ben is showing some school students around the garage, Matt notices that one of the engines does not have a serial number, resulting in tension between him and Ben, who thinks Matt is accusing him of stealing. Matt and Sarah share a kiss. Matt and Ben apologise to each other and Matt asks Sarah to the police graduation ball, which she agrees to go to as friends. They kiss again and start dating, but they initially hide their relationship from Ben. Matt and Ben eventually bond while working on Ben's new car. Matt is given a transfer to Port Campbell and asks Sarah to come with him. She turns the offer down and they agree to a long distance relationship. Matt gives Sarah a friendship ring before he leaves and Ben throws him a farewell party. A few weeks later, Sarah and Matt end their relationship.

Caitlin Atkins

Caitlin Atkins, played by Emily Milburn, made her first screen appearance on 29 September 1997. Milburn unsuccessfully auditioned for the role of Anne Wilkinson. She was cast as Caitlin six months later. Caitlin moved to Erinsborough to be with her adopted brother, Ben (Brett Cousins). She was described as being "wilful and manipulative" by Annette Dasey of Inside Soap. A reporter for the Illawarra Mercury observed, "Caitlin Atkins manages to stir up trouble in Ramsay Street, hiding her inner feelings under an air of tough bravado." Milburn did not share any similarities with Caitlin, but she found it was fun playing her. Caitlin was a competitive swimmer, who developed a romantic interest in her training partner Billy Kennedy (Jesse Spencer).

Paul McClain

Paul McClain, played by Jansen Spencer, made his first screen appearance on 4 November 1997. Spencer auditioned for a small role on the show, but a month later he was told that he had secured a permanent role. Spencer was initially contracted for three months. Of joining the cast as a teen, Spencer commented "Getting a full time job at the age of fifteen or sixteen is a bit weird, because most kids are still at school or just working part time then. You can't really muck around too much on a show like Neighbours because everyone has a job to do." Spencer described Paul as being "a bit of a dag", but thought that as he got older he was becoming cooler. Paul was best friends with Tad Reeves (Jonathon Dutton) and dated Hannah Martin (Rebecca Ritters).

Sondra Pike
 
Sondra Pike, played by Cathy Godbold, made her first appearance on 10 November 1997. The role marked Godbold's first television appearance in two years, following the cancellation of Newlyweds. She had been doing voice over work while attending auditions. Godbold was initially shocked after hearing a message from her agent telling that she had the role, before she ran around her flat screaming. She admitted that being cast in the show was "the best thing that's happened to me in a long time." Goldbold said her character Sondra would "wreak havoc", and described her as "the Heather Locklear of Ramsay Street" in reference to the actress's villainous character Amanda Woodward from Melrose Place. Sondra causes trouble after she is left in charge of a house that Darren Stark (Todd MacDonald) is renovating.

Sondra meets with Darren Stark and introduces herself as Martin Pike's (Fletcher Humphrys) sister, who will be joining them on their house renovation. She explains that she has been taking an interior design course and her father wants her in charge. Darren asks if they can talk about her ideas for the house when he returns to work next week, but Sondra tells him that she wants him back tomorrow, as she does not believe he has a bad back. After Darren's girlfriend Libby Kennedy (Kym Valentine) leaves, Sondra asks him to attend her father's party with her or she will replace him on the renovation project. When Sondra comes to pick Darren up, Libby tells her that the only reason he is going is because Sondra forced him into it, but Sondra replies that Darren jumped at the chance. When they return, Sondra mentions that her father thought they would make a great couple, but Darren tells her that they only have a working relationship. Sondra later tells Libby that Darren is not her type, however, she soon makes it clear that she is romantically interested in him. She makes advances towards him while he is working on the house and he tries to put her off by pretending he wants to kiss her. Sondra hesitates and asks about Libby, but Darren says it is between them and she kisses him. Darren runs off and Sondra questions him about his behaviour. He explains that he was not really coming onto her, he just wanted her to stop flirting with him. Libby also tells Sondra to stop flirting with Darren, but she counters that Darren propositioned her. Sondra continues to pursue Darren, who tells her she has no chance. Days later, Sondra visits Darren to discuss some changes to the bathroom and he later brings Libby to work with him, so Sondra tries talking to her about interior design. Libby gets bored and leaves the site, leading Sondra to ask Darren why he wants to be with Libby and not her. She runs her hands over his body and he tries to fend her off just as Libby returns. Sondra later threatens Darren, but he and Libby dare her to ring her father. Instead she leaves and Libby admits that she feels sorry for her.

Others

References

External links
Characters and cast at the Official AU Neighbours website
Characters and cast at the Official UK Neighbours website
Characters and cast at the Internet Movie Database

1997
, Neighbours